Bematistes macaria, the black-spot bematistes, is a butterfly in the family Nymphalidae. It is found in Senegal, Guinea, Sierra Leone, Liberia, Ivory Coast and Ghana.

Description

P. macaria F. (57 ). The spots of the transverse band of the fore wing in cellules 1 b and 2 are deeply incised  distally or occasionally quite cleft; the hindwing above at the base as far as the apex of the cell dark brown to blackish, then with a distinct light yellowish (male) or white (female) median band. In the male the upperside of the forewing is nearly black in the basal part as far as the transverse band; hence the dark yellow transverse band, which is about 7 mm. in breadth, is sharply defined basally; it forms in the apex of the cell an irregular spot, which usually encloses a rounded spot of the ground-colour. In the female the white transverse band of the fore wing completely fills up the  base of cellule 3 and occasionally also forms 1 or 2 spots in the cell; it may be best distinguished from the female of  [related] species by having the white median band of the hindwing very distinct, rectilinear and very  sharply defined against the dark basal area. Sierra Leone.

Biology
The habitat consists of wetter forests.

The larvae feed on Adenia species.

Taxonomy
See Pierre & Bernaud, 2014

References

External links
Die Gross-Schmetterlinge der Erde 13: Die Afrikanischen Tagfalter. Plate XIII 57 f 
Images representing Acraea macaria at Bold
Images representing Acraea macaria hemileuca at Bold

Butterflies described in 1793
Acraeini